Gaston ("Gast") Waltzing (born 1956) is a Luxembourgian trumpeter and composer. He has created several jazz bands, including Largo and the Luxembourg National Jazz Orchestra, and has composed music for films and television programmes as well as operas combining classical music with jazz and rock. He goes by the nickname of piu.

Biography

Gast Waltzing was born in the city of Luxembourg on 13 August 1956.  He began his music studies at the Conservatoire de Luxembourg when he was just 7 years old.  He continued his classical training at the Brussels Royal Conservatoire, completing his studies at the Conservatoire de Paris.

In 1982, he became professor of trumpet at the Luxembourg Conservatoire and in 1986 founded the school's Jazz Department, which he heads. He has recorded numerous albums covering classical, jazz and dance, with groups such as "Atmosphere", "Life's Circle" "Largo", all of which he created himself. As a composer, he has recorded music for the Luxembourg film A Wop Bop A Lop Bop (1989), as well as for television. The TV film The Way to Dusty Death provided an opportunity for him to compose his first orchestral movie score. Since then, he has continued to write for orchestra and has worked closely with the Luxembourg Philharmonic Orchestra, for which he has conducted the "Pops At The Phil" programmes featuring singers such as Dionne Warwick, Maurane and James Morrison. All in all, he has written over 150 scores for television and movies.

In 2004, he founded WPR Records, which sets out to promote young musicians and has featured the Luxembourg National Jazz Orchestra. In 2008, Waltzing was appointed jazz director at the Echternach International Music Festival.

Awards
1989: Nomination for Best Composer, European Film Awards for A Wopbobaloobop a Lopbamboom
1997: Deutscher Filmpreis (Musik)
2005: Lëtzebuerger Filmpräis for "George and the Dragon"
2016: (together with Angélique Kidjo and the  Orchestre philharmonique du Luxembourg): Grammy Award for the best World Music Album (Sings; 2015)

Film and TV music

Movies

Film music (selection) 
   (1989) by Andy Bausch
   (1993) by Andy Bausch
   (1994) by Hans-Christoph Blumenberg
  Back in Trouble (1997) by Andy Bausch
  Une nuit de cafard (1999) by Jacques Donjean (short)
  New World Disorder (1999) by Richard Spence
  Tödliche Formel (2001) by Tom Kinninmont
  The Point Men (2001) by John Glen
  Os Imortais  (2003) by António-Pedro Vasconcelos
  George and the Dragon (2004) by Tom Reeve
  Psyclist (2006) by Mike Tereba

TV series and films 
   (1991) by Andy Bausch
  Die Männer vom K3 - Tanz auf dem Seil (1993) by Andy Bausch
  Die Männer vom K3 - Keine Chance zu gewinnen (1994) by Andy Bausch
  The Way to Dusty Death (1995) by Geoffrey Reeve
  Zwei Brüder - Nervenkrieg (1997) by Hans-Christoph Blumenberg
  Küstenwache (born 1997) by Marco Serafini
  Der Schnapper: Blumen für den Mörder (1998) by Vadim Glowna
  Polizeiruf 110 - Discokiller (1998) by Marco Serafini
  Polizeiruf 110 - Kurschatten (2001) by Marco Serafini
  Polizeiruf 110 - Doktorspiele (2003) by Marco Serafini
  Utta Danella - Eine Liebe in Venedig (2005) by Marco Serafini
  Polizeiruf 110 - Die Tote aus der Saale (2005) by Marco Serafini

References

External links
 

1956 births
Living people
20th-century classical composers
20th-century trumpeters
20th-century male musicians
21st-century classical composers
21st-century trumpeters
21st-century male musicians
Luxembourgian composers
Luxembourgian trumpeters
Luxembourgian jazz musicians
Male classical composers
Male jazz musicians
People from Luxembourg City